Wang Zongyue was a legendary figure in the history of t'ai chi ch'uan (taijiquan).  In some writings, Wang was a famous student of the legendary Zhang Sanfeng, a 13th-century Taoist monk credited with devising neijia in general and t'ai chi ch'uan in particular.

Wang is also said to have resided in Tai-Gu County, Shan Xi Province in the middle of the 15th Century, and to have learned an early form of t'ai chi in the Jing-Tai Taoist Temple at Bao-ji County.  Two who are said to be Wang's disciples, Chen Zouting and Jiang Fa, went on to make important contributions to the development of modern t'ai chi ch'uan.

Wang is reputed to have authored The T'ai Chi Treatise, alleged by the Wu brothers to have been found in Beijing as part of the Salt Shop Manuals in the mid 19th century.  This treatise records many t'ai chi proverbs; among them: "four ounces deflect one thousand pounds" and "a feather cannot be added; nor can a fly alight".  The T'ai Chi Treatise is among a body of literature collectively referred to as the T'ai chi classics by many t'ai chi ch'uan schools.

T'ai chi ch'uan lineage tree

Connection to Karate

Some Karate scholars theorize about the legendary Chinese master known in Okinawa as Kushanku, being in fact Wang Zongyue

See also
Doc Fai-Wong; Hallander, Jane Tai Chi Chuan's Internal Secrets (1991) Unique Publications . 
Yang Jwing-Ming Tai Chi Secrets of the Yang Style: Chinese Classics, Translations, Commentary (2001) YMAA Publication Center.

References

External links
 Louis Swain's English translation of Tai Chi Chuan Treatise
 Index of T'ai chi ch'uan Classics on Cloud Hands Tai Chi Chuan and Chi Kung
 Zhaobao Tai Chi Lineage Tree

Chinese tai chi practitioners
Neijia